Khalid Maqbool Siddiqui is a Pakistani politician who had been  Federal Minister for Information Technology and Telecommunication, in office from 20 August 2018 to 06 April 2020. He has been a member of the National Assembly of Pakistan, since August 2018 and the leader of the Muttahida Quami Movement Pakistan, since February 2018.

Previously, he was a member of the National Assembly from 1990 to 1993, from 1997 to 1999 and again from June 2013 to May 2018. During his second tenure as member of the National Assembly, he served Federal Minister for Industries and Production from July 1997 to August 1998 in the cabinet of Prime Minister Nawaz Sharif.

Political career

As a student, he became chairman of All Pakistan Muttahidda Students Organization (APMSO) in 1989 while studying in Jinnah Sindh Medical University.

He was elected to the National Assembly of Pakistan as a candidate of Haq Parast Group (HPG) from Constituency NA-169 (Hyderabad-III) in 1990 general election. The Muttahida Qaumi Movement (MQM) had fielded candidates for the 1990 general election under the banner of the HPG. In 1993, he was appointed as deputy convener of MQM.

He was elected to the National Assembly as a candidate of HPG from Constituency NA-169 (Hyderabad-III) in 1997 Pakistani general election. In July 1997, he was inducted into the federal cabinet of Prime Minister Nawaz Sharif and was appointed as Federal Minister for Industries and Production where he continued to serve until August 1998.

He was re-elected to the National Assembly as a candidate of MQM from Constituency NA-219 (Hyderabad-I) in 2013 Pakistani general election. He received 141,035 votes and defeated Ali Muhammad Sehto, a candidate of Pakistan Peoples Party (PPP).

On 11 February 2018, he was elevated from deputy Convener of MQM to Convener of MQM after the Coordination Committee of MQM appointed him as the new Convener of the party, replacing Farooq Sattar. In retaliation, Farooq Sattar dissolved the party's Coordination Committee and called for fresh intra-party election. On 18 February, Farooq Sattar was elected as Convener of the party in intra-party election. Faction of MQM led by Siddique challenged the polls and filed a petition in the Election Commission of Pakistan (ECP) and stated that since Farooq Sattar was removed as convener on 11 February, he had no authority to hold the intra-party elections. On 26 March 2018, the ECP ruled in favour of Siddiqui and removed Farooq Sattar as Convener of MQM.

On 28 March 2018, Farooq Sattar filed a petition in the Islamabad High Court to against the decision of the ECP to suspend him as the convener of the MQM. On 11 June, the Islamabad High Court dismissed the petition and upheld the orders of the ECP.

He was re-elected to the National Assembly as a candidate of MQM from Constituency NA-255 (Karachi Central-III) in 2018 Pakistani general election.

On 18 August, Imran Khan formally announced his federal cabinet structure and Siddiqui was named as Minister for Information Technology and Telecommunication. On 20 August 2018, he was sworn in as Federal Minister for Information Technology and Telecommunication in the federal cabinet of Prime Minister Imran Khan.

On 20 August 2018, a court declared Siddiqui proclaimed absconder in a case regarding violation of the Loudspeaker Act.

On 6 April in a cabinet reshuffle, his resignation was accepted by PM Imran Khan.

On March 30th 2022, Khalid Maqbool Siddiqui's MQM-P left the coalition government of Prime Minister Imran Khan.

References

Living people
Muttahida Qaumi Movement politicians
Pakistani MNAs 2013–2018
People from Sindh
Muttahida Qaumi Movement MNAs
Jinnah Sindh Medical University alumni
Politicians from Hyderabad, Sindh
Pakistani MNAs 2018–2023
Year of birth missing (living people)